Choleeswaram temple is a 10th-century Chola Dynasty Solesvara temple built in honour of emperor Raja Raja Chola I in Peraru, Kantalai, Trincomalee District. Inscriptions found at the ruins of this temple relate to its establishment and connection to Trincomalee's ancient Koneswaram temple. It is made in Dravidian architecture of the Chola period.

10th-century Hindu temples
Hindu temples in Trincomalee District